George Frederick Charles Searle FRS (3 December 1864 – 16 December 1954) was a British physicist and teacher. He also raced competitively as a cyclist while at the University of Cambridge.

Biography
Searle was born in Oakington, Cambridgeshire, England. His father was William George Searle.

As a child, he knew Clerk Maxwell, whom he considered to be a humorous individual. In 1888 he began work at the Cavendish Laboratory under J.J. Thomson, and ended up working with the lab for 55 years. After World War II, he ran the undergraduate labs. The equipment he used with Thomson to calibrate the ohm in the 1890s was still being used in the undergraduate lab.

Contributions to science
Searle is known for his work on the velocity dependence of the electromagnetic mass. This was a direct predecessor of Einstein's theory of special relativity, when several people were investigating the change of mass with velocity. Following the work of Oliver Heaviside, he defined the "Heaviside ellipsoid", in which the electrostatic field is contracted in the line of motion. Those developments, when modified, were ultimately important for the development of special relativity.

Personal life
Searle was married to Alice Mary Edwards. He contracted a disease at the beginning of World War I, was cured, and became a Christian Scientist. He was a keen cyclist and travelled about proselytizing.

Bibliography

Searle was the author of papers and books, including: 
Experimental elasticity (1908) Cambridge Univ. Press
Experimental harmonic motion A Manual for the Laboratory, 1st edition (1915) Cambridge Univ. Press
Experimental harmonic motion, 2nd edition (1922) Cambridge Univ. Press
Experimental optics, 1st edition (1925) Cambridge Univ. Press
Experimental optics, 2nd edition (1935) Cambridge Univ. Press
Experimental physics, (1934) Cambridge Univ. Press
Oliver Heaviside, the man (1987) C.A.M. Publishing, England (written in 1950, published posthumously)

References

Fellows of the Royal Society
1864 births
1954 deaths
People from Oakington
Velocity
Electromagnetic radiation
Special relativity